The Call of Duty Pro League was an annual Call of Duty league held twice each season. To determine qualification, teams must play at other tournaments to gather Pro Points.

The inaugural league started in 2014 on Call of Duty: Ghosts for the Xbox 360 and was won by compLexity Gaming.

As with the Call of Duty World League, the Call of Duty Pro League was replaced by the franchised Call of Duty League from 2020 onwards.

Results by year

References 

Pro League
Recurring events established in 2013
Sports competitions in Los Angeles
Major League Gaming competitions